Jagoda Marinić (born September 20, 1977 in Waiblingen) is a prize-winning author, novelist, playwright, essayist, and journalist from Germany. She has what is often called a “migrant background,” a term she rejects; her parents emigrated from Dalmatia in Croatia, SFR Yugoslavia to Germany in the 1970s. She herself was born in Germany, became a German citizen, and speaks and writes in prominent venues about identity, migration, citizenship, and integration. She lives in Heidelberg.

Early life and education
Marinić studied American literature, German literature, and political science at Heidelberg University.

Career
Marinić's first book of stories, Eigentlich ein Heiratsantrag, [Actually a Marriage Proposal] was published in 2001 and she received the Grimmelshausen-Preis for her 2005 story collection Russische Bücher [Russian Books]. Both collections appeared with Suhrkamp. She published her first novel, Die Namenlose [The No-Name] in 2006. Her second novel, Restaurant Dalmatia was published in 2013 by Hoffmann und Campe and has been widely reviewed. It is set in Toronto, Berlin, and Croatia, and explores the self-awareness and homecomings of uprooted, displaced characters as they gain a sense of identity in a fractured world.

In addition to her fiction writing, she publishes theater reviews and writes op-eds for the Frankfurter Rundschau. Her recent political essays begin as formal lectures. She presented Was ist Deutsch in Deutschland [What is German in Germany], for example, at the 3rd Nürnberg Conference on Integration in 2013. Rassimus sichtbar machen [Making Racism Visible] (2012) addresses the NSU murders,  and Wir können alles außer leben [We Can Do Everything But Live] argues for political suffrage for all residents of Germany, especially for those immigrants who helped reconstruct the German economy during the “economic miracle.”

In June 2007 Marinić was one of 18 participants in the 31st Festival of German-Language Literature (Ingeborg-Bachmann-Prize) competition in Klagenfurt where she read her story Netzhaut [Retina].

Other activities
Marinić has been a member of the PEN Centre Germany since 2012. She regularly leads writing workshops for children and students. In 2012 she became founding director of the "Interkulturelles Zentrum in Gründung" in Heidelberg. Marinić is a member of the Interkulturellen Rat in Deutschland e. V. She is on the board and serves as speaker for the Stiftung Internationale Wochen gegen Rassismus. She serves UNESCO by working on the Intangible Cultural Heritage project for Germany and with the UNESCO City of Literature project for Heidelberg.  She is also a member of the jury for the Stuttgart Intercultural Culture Project. 
In fall 2015 she accepted a week-long position as Writer-in-Residence at Davidson College, supported by the German Embassy in Washington, D.C. In this context she held a speech at Davidson College, called "What we talk about when we talk about us. How the American Dream turned German - A lecture on Refugees, Migration, Integration and Citizenship in Germany on the occasion of 25 Years of German Unity".

Works
 Eigentlich ein Heiratsantrag. Geschichten, Suhrkamp, Frankfurt am Main 2001, 
 Russische Bücher. Erzählungen, Suhrkamp, Frankfurt am Main 2005, 
 Die Namenlose. Roman, Nagel & Kimche, Zürich 2007, 
 Alles macht mich aus. Interview. In: BELLA triste Nr. 19, Hildesheim 2007
 Gebrauchsanweisung für Kroatien, Piper, München 2013, 
 Restaurant Dalmatia. Roman, Hoffmann und Campe, Hamburg 2013, 
 Made in Germany: Was ist deutsch in Deutschland Hoffmann und Campe, Hamburg 2016,

Recognition
Marinić received the Hermann-Lenz-Stipendium scholarship in 1999 and Kunststiftung Baden-Württemberg prize for young authors (Förderpreis) in 2003.  Her play Zalina was recognized with the award for excellence for the “best program of the year for the cultural capital Hermannstadt” in 2007. 2008 she was Scout for Heidelberger Stückemarkt, host state was Croatia. Her play Wer war Kitty Genovese? [Who Was Kitty Genovese?] was nominated for the Leonhard Frank Prize in 2011.

References

External links
 Literature by and about Jagoda Marinić in the catalogue of the 
 Author page at Hoffmann und Campe
 Author Page at Suhrkamp-Verlag
 Offizielle Official Webpage
 Author’s literature blog

Categories 
Category: 21st-century German novelists; Croatian novelists ;

1977 births
21st-century German novelists
Living people